University Farm may refer to:
University Farm (Indiana), a residential neighborhood in the city of West Lafayette, Indiana, named for its proximity to Purdue University
University Farm (Nottinghamshire), a commercial research farm attached to the Sutton Bonington Campus of the University of Nottingham, England
University Farm, the original name of University of California, Davis